Peter H. Werner (born January 17, 1947, in New York City, New York) is an American film and television director.

Biography
Werner was born to a Jewish family, in New York City, New York, one of three children born to Elizabeth (née Grumbach) and Henry Werner. He has one sister, Patsy Werner Hanson, and one brother, Tom Werner.

In 1977, Werner won the Oscar for Best Live Action Short Film for directing the short film In the Region of Ice. Since then he worked on primarily directing television amassing a number of television film credits namely Mama Flora's Family, Two Mothers for Zachary, Call Me Claus, I Married a Centerfold, Gracie's Choice, Mom at Sixteen, Tempting Fate, among other films including Front of the Class (2008).

His television series credits include Ghost Whisperer, Medium, Law & Order: Criminal Intent, A Different World, The Wonder Years, Moonlighting, and for the Graham Yost series Boomtown and Justified, among other series. He also directed a television movie in 2010 called Bond of Silence.

Personal life
Werner's first wife was Marie Ashton; they later divorced and she remarried to Gerard L. Friend. He remarried to Kedren Jones. Werner is the father of three children: Lillie Werner Singh, Katharine Werner, and James Werner. He is the older brother of television producer Tom Werner.

References

External links

1947 births
20th-century American Jews
American television directors
Directors of Live Action Short Film Academy Award winners
Living people
Film directors from New York City
21st-century American Jews